One Week may refer to:

 One Week (1920 film), a short film starring and co-directed by Buster Keaton
 One Week (2008 film), a Canadian feature film directed by Michael McGowan
 "One Week" (song), a 1998 song by Barenaked Ladies

See also 
 One Week to Save Your Marriage